Kuhdasht-e Gharbi Rural District is a rural district (dehestan) in the Central District of Miandorud County, Mazandaran Province, Iran. At the 2006 census, its population was 10,422, in 2,674 families. The rural district has 13 villages.

References 

Rural Districts of Mazandaran Province
Miandorud County